Pareek is a surname. Notable people with the surname include:

 Anil Pareek (born 1957), Indian medical researcher
 Ashwani Pareek (born 1969), Indian plant biologist and educator
 Rajendra Pareek (born 1948), Indian politician
 Rakesh Pareek (born 1959), Indian politician